Blastomycosis-like pyoderma is a cutaneous condition characterized by large verrucous plaques with elevated borders and multiple pustules.

See also 
 List of cutaneous conditions
 pyoderma
 blastomycosis

References

External links 

Bacterium-related cutaneous conditions